Digital Mystikz are a dubstep production duo consisting of Mala (born Mark Lawrence), and Coki (born Dean Harris, 26 August 1980) from the South London suburb of Norwood. Along with Loefah and SGT Pokes, who make up the group ASBO (All Soundbwoy Out), they operate the DMZ record label and host the influential bimonthly nightclub DMZ, held at the Mass club complex in Brixton, London. BBC Radio 1 DJ John Peel was an early supporter of Digital Mystikz, eventually putting them in his annual 2004 top 50 list at number 29. They are among the scene's most famous producers. Their song "Anti War Dub" appeared in the 2006 film Children of Men, although it wasn't included in the soundtrack. In the summer of 2008, Mala was chosen to headline the night portion of the Sónar Festival in Barcelona. In April 2011, Mala travelled to Cuba with Gilles Peterson who was returning to Havana to produce the second instalment in the Havana Cultura series. While Peterson recorded new material with local musicians, Mala began work on a new album Mala in Cuba, which was released in September 2012.

DMZ

DMZ has been described as one of Dubstep's two "most influential regular clubnight[s]" (with its predecessor FWD>> the other one) and "central to the scene".  Since starting in March 2005, the club's attendance has increased steadily.  DMZ's first anniversary, when a queue of 600 people forced the club to move from its regular 400-capacity space to Mass' main room, has been cited as a pivotal moment in Dubstep's history.  BBC Radio 1 DJ Mary Anne Hobbs, whose support of Dubstep has increased the music's popularity, discovered it at DMZ. Straight outta Croydon fliers carry the slogan "come meditate on bass weight".  In 2005, an assortment of songs were created specifically to be played on the club's soundsystem.

Discography 

– Releases are sorted by the earliest release date.
– Some of the early DMZ releases were later sent off digital stores.
– Japanese version of Urban Ethics album (P-Vine Records / PCD-93430) features 3 bonus tracks – "Mappa Riddim", "Sweety" and "Dark Force".
– Japanese version of Mala in Cuba album (Beat Records / BRC-348) features 15th bonus track "Rising".

References

External links
 Discogs 
 Archived DMZ Official site
 2004 Interview
 2006 Interview
 BBC Collective dubstep documentary filmed at DMZ 1st Birthday, 2005. Interviews with Mala, Loefah, Skream, Kode 9, Youngsta...
 Redbull Music Academy Lecture with Mala. 2009

English electronic music duos
Dubstep music groups
Record production duos
British record production teams
Male musical duos
Musical groups from the London Borough of Croydon